Monzo is an online bank based in the United Kingdom.

Monzo or Monzó may also refer to:
Monzo (video game), a 2014 video game
Monzo (Transformers), a character from Transformers

People with the surname
Emilio Monzó (born 1965), Argentine lawyer and politician
Ferrán Monzó (born 1992), Spanish footballer
Jaime Monzó (1946–2020), Spanish swimmer
José Pascual Monzo (born 1952), Spanish politician
Quim Monzó (born 1952), Spanish writer

People with the given name
Monzo Akiyama (1891–1944), Imperial Japanese Navy admiral

See also